Konstantin Mirchev (born 24 July 1978) is a Bulgarian footballer who last played as a midfielder for Lokomotiv Plovdiv. His first club was CSKA Sofia.

Career
He was a midfielder for Cypriot club Omonia Aradippou in 2008-2009 and 2009-2010. He was the leading scorer for Omonia for both seasons.

Bulgarian football star Dimitar Berbatov, Mirchev's former teammate at CSKA, cited Mirchev when asked to name his closest friends. He said Mirchev was a staunch supporter of Berbatov's decision to retire from the national team in May 2010.

References 

Bulgarian footballers
1978 births
Living people
Association football midfielders
First Professional Football League (Bulgaria) players
Cypriot Second Division players
Omonia Aradippou players
Onisilos Sotira players
PFC CSKA Sofia players
PFC Spartak Varna players
PFC Cherno More Varna players
FC Botev Vratsa players
PFC Lokomotiv Plovdiv players
Expatriate footballers in Cyprus